Fernando Cardozo or Cardoso may refer to:

Fernando Henrique Cardoso (born 1930), Brazilian sociologist and politician
Fernando Cardozo (footballer, born 1979), Brazilian football defender
Fernando Cardoso (footballer), Brazilian football defensive midfielder
Fernando Cardozo (footballer, born 2001), Paraguayan football forward
Fernando Daniel Cardozo Brandon, Uruguayan footballer in 2007–08 Honduran Liga Nacional
Fernando Cardoso (sport shooter), participated in Shooting at the 2007 Pan American Games